City Districts of Pakistan are districts in Pakistan that consists primarily of an urban area, such as a mega city or large metropolitan area. While there are 150 total districts in Pakistan, only 8 had been designated as "city districts" in 2001. City Districts were assigned administrative boards responsible for certain areas of governance in their respective areas. The degree of administrative autonomy of these districts similarly varies greatly.

Administrative structure
City districts consist of a three-tier or four-tier system of government. Each city district is subdivided into Tehsils (or Towns), which are further subdivided into Union Councils, which may further be subdivided into Wards.

List of city districts

Sindh Province
Karachi City is a division itself and it comprises seven districts that work together under the Karachi Metropolitan Corporation.

 Karachi Central District
 Karachi East District
 Karachi South District
 Karachi West District 
Malir District
Korangi District (established in 2013) 
 Keamari District (established in 2020) 
During 14 Aug 2001 to 2011, Karachi Division was abolished and all of the five districts (at that time) of Karachi were merged into single city district, forming city district government Karachi i.e CDGK.

Punjab Province 
On 14 Aug 2001, 5 major urban districts of Punjab were given the status of City Districts. These Districts were the Headquarters of Divisions of Punjab before 2001. The Bahawalpur, Dera Ghazi Khan and Sargodha Division headquarters were not included in city districts due to semi-urban status. 
 Lahore District
 Rawalpindi District
 Faisalabad District
 Multan District
 Gujranwala District

Khyber Pakhtunkhwa 

 Bannu District
 Peshawar District

Baluchistan Province 

 Quetta District
 Hub District

References

External links
 The Local Government Ordinance 2001
 Several additional cities given City District status

Districts of Pakistan
Pakistan